Mathias Dam Westergaard (born 21 February 1994) is a Danish former professional cyclist, who currently works as a directeur sportif for UCI Continental team .

Major results
2012
 1st Stage 3 Driedaagse van Axel
2015
 3rd Duo Normand
2016
 1st Ronde van Noord-Holland
 5th Sundvolden GP

References

External links

1994 births
Living people
Danish male cyclists
Sportspeople from Aalborg